George Murray (November 2, 1828 – February 12, 1888) was a physician and political figure in Nova Scotia, Canada. He represented Pictou County in the Nova Scotia House of Assembly from 1867 to 1871 as an Anti-Confederation Party member.

He was born at Barneys River, Pictou County, Nova Scotia, and educated at the Pictou Academy. He received a M.D. in Pennsylvania in 1850. In 1854, he married Mary Patterson. Murray died in New Glasgow, Nova Scotia at the age of 59.

References 
 A Directory of the Members of the Legislative Assembly of Nova Scotia, 1758-1958, Public Archives of Nova Scotia (1958)

1828 births
1888 deaths
Nova Scotia Anti-Confederation Party MLAs